The 1895 Rhode Island gubernatorial election was held on April 3, 1895. Republican nominee Charles W. Lippitt defeated Democratic nominee George L. Littlefield with 56.89% of the vote.

General election

Candidates
Major party candidates
Charles W. Lippitt, Republican
George L. Littlefield, Democratic

Other candidates
Smith Quimby, Prohibition
George Boomer, Socialist Labor
William Foster Jr., People's

Results

References

1895
Rhode Island
1895 Rhode Island elections